In electrostatics, the coefficients of potential determine the relationship between the charge and electrostatic potential (electrical potential), which is purely geometric:

where  is the surface charge on conductor . The coefficients of potential are the coefficients .  should be correctly read as the potential on the -th conductor, and hence "" is the  due to charge 1 on conductor 2.

Note that:
 , by symmetry, and
  is not dependent on the charge.

The physical content of the symmetry is as follows:
 if a charge  on conductor  brings conductor  to a potential , then the same charge placed on  would bring  to the same potential .

In general, the coefficients is used when describing system of conductors, such as in the capacitor.

Theory
System of conductors.

Given the electrical potential on a conductor surface  (the equipotential surface or the point  chosen on surface ) contained in a system of conductors :

where , i.e. the distance from the area-element  to a particular point  on conductor .  is not, in general, uniformly distributed across the surface. Let us introduce the factor  that describes how the actual charge density differs from the average and itself on a position on the surface of  the -th conductor:

or
 
Then,

It can be shown that  is independent of the distribution . Hence, with 

we have

Example
In this example, we employ the method of coefficients of potential to determine the capacitance on a two-conductor system.

For a two-conductor system, the system of linear equations is

On a capacitor, the charge on the two conductors is equal and opposite: . Therefore,

and

Hence,

Related coefficients 
Note that the array of linear equations

can be inverted to

For a system of two spherical conductors held at the same potential,

If the two conductors carry equal and opposite charges,

The system of conductors can be shown to have similar symmetry .

References

 James Clerk Maxwell (1873) A Treatise on Electricity and Magnetism, § 86, page 89.

Electrostatics